In Person is a "live" in-studio album by jazz saxophonist Cannonball Adderley recorded in Hollywood, California in 1968 featuring performances by Adderley with Nat Adderley, Joe Zawinul, Victor Gaskin and Roy McCurdy with guest vocalists Lou Rawls and Nancy Wilson contributing on one song apiece. "The Scavenger" is the product of observation, being written by Zawinul during the previous year's garbage collection strike in New York City. "Sweet Emma" is Nat's tribute to the New Orleans pianist Sweet Emma Barrett.

Reception
The Allmusic review by Scott Yanow awarded the album only 1½ stars but states "It's a loose but fun live session".

Track listing
 "Rumplestiltskin" (Joe Zawinul) - 11:46
 "I'd Rather Drink Muddy Water" (Eddie Miller) - 5:02
 "Save Your Love for Me" (Buddy Johnson) - 4:45
 "The Scene" (Zawinul, Nat Adderley) - 2:20
 "Somewhere" (Leonard Bernstein, Stephen Sondheim) - 5:35
 "The Scavenger" (Zawinul) - 9:54
 "Sweet Emma" (Nat Adderley) - 5:16
 "Zorba" (John Kander, Fred Ebb) - 3:32
Recorded in Hollywood, CA on September 23 (tracks 2-4) & October 7 (tracks 1 & 5-8), 1968

Personnel
Cannonball Adderley - alto saxophone, soprano saxophone
Nat Adderley - cornet
Joe Zawinul - Acoustic and Electric piano
Victor Gaskin - bass
Roy McCurdy - drums
Lou Rawls - vocals (track 2)
Nancy Wilson - vocals (track 3)

References

1968 live albums
Capitol Records live albums
Cannonball Adderley live albums
Albums produced by David Axelrod (musician)